Broadway Theater, also known as the New Broadway Theatre, Fox Broadway, Kerasotes Broadway Theatre, was a historic vaudeville house and movie theater located at Cape Girardeau, Missouri.  It was erected in 1921, and was a two-story, red brick building with a white, glazed brick façade.  The building consisted of the theatre/storefront zone on the first level and a second zone with office space on the second level.

The theater had a major fire March 31, 2021.

It was listed on the National Register of Historic Places in 2015. It was located in the Broadway Commercial Historic District.

References

External links
Cinema Treasures

Individually listed contributing properties to historic districts on the National Register in Missouri
Theatres on the National Register of Historic Places in Missouri
Theatres completed in 1921
Buildings and structures in Cape Girardeau County, Missouri
National Register of Historic Places in Cape Girardeau County, Missouri
1921 establishments in Missouri